Beatrice Morgari (1858, Turin – 1936, Turin) was an Italian painter, mainly of genre subjects, often depicting intimate family scenes.

She was born into a family of painters including her uncle Rodolfo Morgari, who was professor at the Accademia Albertina. Her father was Paolo Emilio Morgari. Her brother Luigi Morgari was also a painter. She exhibited in 1880 at Turin: Curiosetta and a design for a tapestry.

References

1858 births
1936 deaths
19th-century Italian painters
19th-century Italian women artists
Painters from Turin
Italian genre painters
Italian portrait painters
Italian women painters